County Courts Act (with its variations) is a stock short title used for legislation in the United Kingdom and Victoria relating to county courts.

The Bill for an Act with this short title may have been known as a County Courts Bill during its passage through Parliament.

County Courts Acts may be a generic name either for legislation bearing that short title or for all legislation which relates to county courts.

List

United Kingdom
The County Courts Act 1846 (9 & 10 Vict c 95) 
The County Courts Act 1849 (12 & 13 Vict c 101)
The County Courts Act 1850 (13 & 14 Vict c 61) (County Courts Extension Act 1850)
The County Courts Act 1852 (15 & 16 Vict c 54)
The County Courts Act 1856 (19 & 20 Vict c 108)
The County Courts Act 1858 (21 & 22 Vict c 74)
The County Courts Act 1859 (22 & 23 Vict c 57)
The County Courts Act 1865 (28 & 29 Vict c 99) (County Courts Equitable Jurisdiction Act)
The County Courts Act 1866 (29 & 30 Vict c 14)
The County Courts Act 1867 (30 & 31 Vict c 142)
The County Courts Admiralty Jurisdiction Act 1868 (31 & 32 Vict c 71)
The County Court (Buildings) Act 1870 (33 & 34 Vict c 15)
The County Courts Act 1875 (38 & 39 Vict c 50)
The County Courts (Costs and Salaries) Act 1882 (45 & 46 Vict c 57)
The County Courts (Expenses) Act 1887 (50 & 51 Vict c 3)
The County Courts (Investment) Act 1900 (63 & 64 Vict c 47)
The County Courts Act 1924 (14 & 15 Geo 5 c 17)
The County Courts (Amendment) Act 1934 (24 & 25 Geo 5 c 17)
The County Courts Act 1934 (24 & 25 Geo 5 c 53)
The County Courts Act 1955 (4 & 5 Eliz 2 c 8)
The County Courts Act 1959 (7 & 8 Eliz 2 c 22)
The County Courts (Jurisdiction) Act 1963 (11 & 12 Eliz 2 c 53)
The County Courts Act 1984 (c 28)

The County Courts Acts 1888 to 1919 was the collective title of the following Acts:
The County Courts Act 1888 (51 & 52 Vict c 43)
The County Courts Act 1903 (3 Edw 7 c 42)
The County Court Judges (Retirement Pensions and Deputies) Act 1919 (9 & 10 Geo 5 c 70)
The County Courts Act 1919 (9 & 10 Geo 5 c 70)

Ireland
The Civil Bill Courts in Ireland played a similar judicial role to the County Courts in England.

The County Courts (Ireland) Acts 1851 to 1889 was the collective title of the following Acts:
The Civil Bill Courts (Ireland) Act 1851 (14 & 15 Vict c 57)
The Civil Bill Courts Procedure Amendment Act (Ireland) 1864 (27 & 28 Vict c 99)
The Civil Bill Courts Procedure Amendment Act (Ireland) 1871 (34 & 35 Vict c 99)
The Civil Bill Courts (Ireland) Act 1874 (37 & 38 Vict c 66)
The Chairman of Quarter Sessions (Ireland) Jurisdiction Act 1876 (39 & 40 Vict c 71)
The County Officers and Courts (Ireland) Act 1877 (40 & 41 Vict c 56)
The County Court Amendment (Ireland) Act 1882 (45 & 46 Vict c 29)
The County Court Appeals (Ireland) Act 1889 (52 & 53 Vict c 48)

Victoria
The County Court Act 1890 (No 1078)

See also
List of short titles

References
Pitt-Lewis and de Colyar. "Tabular Index to the County Courts Acts". A Complete Practice of the County Courts. Stevens and Sons. Chancery Lane, London. 1890. Part I. Pages xxi to xxxvi.
Pollock and Nicol. "Numerical Index to the County Courts Acts". Pollock's Practice of the County Courts. Seventh Edition. H Sweet. London. 1870. Pages  361 to 372.
Wetherfield, George Manley. The County Court Statutes from 1846 to 1875. Crosby Lockwood & Co. London. 1876. Google Books.
Stephen's County Court Acts, Orders, and Practice. 2nd Ed. William Clowes and Sons. 1890. Google Books.

Lists of legislation by short title and collective title
County courts in England and Wales
United Kingdom Acts of Parliament 1846
United Kingdom Acts of Parliament 1955
United Kingdom Acts of Parliament 1959
Courts of England and Wales